Pesing Station (PSG) is a railway station in Wijaya Kusuma, Grogol Petamburan, West Jakarta, Indonesia. It is the third station on the Duri-Tangerang branch line and KRL Commuterline Brown Line service. The station is near to the office of television broadcasting company Indosiar.

Building and layout 
Initially this station had 2 train lines with line 1 being a straight line in both directions, this station also used to have money orders. However, since the Brown Line became a double track, the switchboard was dismantled, then line 1 was made a straight line towards Duri, while line 2 was made a straight track towards Tangerang.

Services
The following is a list of train services at the Pesing Station.

Passenger services 
 KAI Commuter

Intermodal support

Incidents 

 On 10 March 2016, a fire occurred in a densely populated settlement in the Pesing area. The railroad track at Pesing Station was packed with people who were busy putting out the fire. As a result, all Tangerang-Duri KRL trips were disrupted.
 On 3 June 2016, a KRL broke down at Pesing Station. As a result, the entire KRL carriage became pitch black for fifteen minutes until it finally came back to normal. KRL trips were disrupted when the KRL broke down.
 On 22 September 2017, there was a breakdown on one of the KRL circuits at Pesing Station. As a result, KRL trips on the Tangerang-Duri route were disrupted. Later, the KRL had to be taken to the Bukit Duri KRL depot to undergo repairs.

References

External links

West Jakarta
Railway stations in Jakarta
Railway stations opened in 1899